is a junction passenger railway station located in the city of Tokorozawa, Saitama, Japan, operated by the private railway operator Seibu Railway.

Lines
Nishi-Tokorozawa is located 27.2 km from the terminus of the Seibu Ikebukuro Line at Ikebukuro Station.

Station layout
The station consists of two ground-level side platforms and one island platform, serving four tracks.

Platforms
Platforms 1 and 2 are bidirectional platforms used by Sayama Line services, and platforms 3 and 4 are used by Seibu Ikebukuro Line services. Through trains in the up direction from the Sayama Line to Ikebukuro normally use platform 1.

History
It was renamed Nishi-Tokorozawa on 1 September 1915.

Station numbering was introduced on all Seibu Railway lines during fiscal 2012, with Nishi-Tokorozawa Station becoming "SI18".

Passenger statistics
In fiscal 2019, the station was the 40th busiest on the Seibu network with an average of 25,720 passengers daily.

The passenger figures for the station in previous years are as shown below.

Surrounding area
 Saitama Prefectural Tokorozawa High School

References

External links

 Nishi-Tokorozawa Station information (Seibu) 
 Nishi-Tokorozawa Station information (Saitama Prefectural Government) 

Railway stations in Saitama Prefecture
Railway stations in Japan opened in 1915
Seibu Ikebukuro Line
Railway stations in Tokorozawa, Saitama
Seibu Sayama Line